Seavey House may refer to:

in the United States (by state then city)
Seavey House (Goshen, New Hampshire), listed on the National Register of Historic Places (NRHP) in Sullivan County
A. B. Seavey House, Saco, Maine, listed on the NRHP in York County
Seavey-Robinson House, South Portland, Maine, listed on the NRHP in Cumberland County
Dr. John B. Seavey House and Cemetery, Harrells, North Carolina, listed on the NRHP in Sampson County